The Leitrim Wetlands (also known as Albion Road Wetlands) is a large provincially significant bog just south of Findlay Creek, a suburban neighbourhood in the city of Ottawa, Ontario, Canada. Efforts to protect it from development have been a longstanding issue for environmental organizations in the city.

References 

Bogs of Canada
Geography of Ottawa